Malhar Thakar is an Indian actor who primarily works in the Gujarati film industry and theatre.

Biography 
He studied at Shree Ambe Vidyalaya and Sheth C. N. Vidyalaya, Ahmedabad.

After nine years in theatre, he eventually broke into film roles. His debut film as the lead role was Chhello Divas (2015) which was commercially successful. His Love Ni Bhavai (2017) achieved critical and commercial success and ran for more than 100 days in theatres. Golkeri (2020) was also declared hit.

In 2018, Thakar started his own production house, Ticket Window Entertainment. In April 2020, he announced the establishment of an NGO to help people affected during the COVID-19 pandemic in India. He debuted in Hindi cinema with his supporting role in Maja Ma (2022).

Filmography

Television and web series

Films

Music videos

Plays 

 5 Star Aunty

 Maari Wife Mary Kom

References

External links

Living people
Male actors in Gujarati-language films
Gujarati theatre
Gujarati people
Male actors from Ahmedabad
Indian male stage actors
Indian male film actors
21st-century Indian male actors
1990 births